Jay's Jungle is an Australian children's television show which was broadcast every weekday on 7TWO from January 2015 to May 2018. The series was created and produced by Ambience Entertainment.

Cast
 Jay Laga'aia as Jay
 Kenneth Moraleda as C-MOR
 Mat McCoy as Funk-E
 Emma De Vries as Jess-E
 Mal Heap and Mark Simpson as Leonard
 Courtney Stewart as Tash
 Emily McKnight as Lani

References

External links
 
 Ambience Entertainment (archive)
 Jay's Jungle on 7plus

7two original programming
Australian children's television series
2015 Australian television series debuts
2018 Australian television series endings
Australian preschool education television series
Australian television shows featuring puppetry
2010s preschool education television series
English-language television shows
Television series about monkeys